The Skipat Stakes is an American Thoroughbred horse race held annually at Pimlico Race Course in Baltimore, Maryland. Contested over a distance of six furlongs on the dirt, it is open to fillies and mares three-years-old and up.

The race is during the latter part of April/early May and was named in honor of Skipat, a rangy, 17.1-hand chestnut daughter of Jungle Cove. She won 27 races from 45 starts over six years, earning $614,215 in her career. In 1979 and 1981, she won the grade two Barbara Fritchie Handicap. Her second victory in the Fritchie came after she had been retired, bred and foaled. In August 1989, she was struck by lightning and killed in her stall. Her foal (Skilaunch) was standing next to her, survived, and went on to produce five stakes winners from five foals.

The Skipat Stakes is the lead off leg of the Mid Atlantic Thoroughbred Championships Fillies and Mare Sprint Dirt Division or MATCh Races.  MATCh is a series of five races in five separate thoroughbred divisions run throughout four Mid-Atlantic States including; Pimlico Race Course and Laurel Park Racecourse in Maryland; Delaware Park Racetrack in Delaware; Parx, Philadelphia Park and Presque Isle Downs in Pennsylvania and Monmouth Park in New Jersey.

Records 

Speed record: 
 6 furlongs - 1:09.80 - Weather Vane (1998)  &  Big Bambu (2001)
 6.5 furlongs - 1:16.40 - Cherokee Wonder (1996)  & Smart 'n Noble  (1995)

Most wins by a jockey:
 3 - Mario Pino (1995, 1998 & 2001)

Most wins by a trainer:
 2 - Richard W. Delp (1995 & 1998)
 2 - Michael E. Gorham (2000 & 2006)
 2 - Timothy F. Ritchey (2002 & 2008)

Winners of the Skipat Stakes

See also 

 Skipat Stakes top three finishers and starters
 Pimlico Race Course
 List of graded stakes at Pimlico Race Course

References

Ungraded stakes races in the United States
1981 establishments in Maryland
Pimlico Race Course
Horse races in Maryland
Recurring sporting events established in 1981